James H. Coon (9 November 1914 – 10 March 1996) physicist at Los Alamos Scientific Laboratory, made significant contributions to the science and study of neutron interactions. He worked on the Vera satellite project.

Life and Times
James Huntington Coon was born on 9 November 1914 and died on 10 March 1996. He was interred at the Guaje Pines Cemetery, burial plot of Section 5, Lot 146C in Los Alamos, New Mexico.

Education
Coon attended Indiana University at Bloomington, Indiana and graduated in 1937 with a Bachelor of Arts in chemistry. Outside of studies, he had membership in the Chemistry Dolphin Club, Der Deutsche Verein (The German Club) and the Varsity Swimming team.

In 1942, Coon received a Ph.D. in physics from the University of Chicago.

Los Alamos
In 1944, scientists at Los Alamos Scientific Laboratory designed field experiments to measure the air blast and ground shock effects from the Trinity device. In March 1945, an exploration geophysicist Herbert M. Houghton, from Geophysical Research Corporation (GRC) and Tidewater Oil, was hired to work with Coon.  The team of Coon and Houghton was tasked to make ready the earth shock instrumentation for the 7 May 1945 calibration rehearsal shot of a 100-ton TNT device and the Trinity test in July 1945.

In March 1954, Coon resided in New Mexico according to the 1954 National Register of Scientific and Technical Personnel.

In 1954, Coon was P-4 group leader along with P-6 group leader Elizabeth Riddle Graves at Los Alamos. The Coon and Graves groups utilized a 250 kV Cockcroft-Walton generator to accelerate Deuterons to bombard Tritium (H-3) inside a Zirconium target with Tritium to produce 14 MeV neutrons. The scientists at Los Alamos were interested in how neutrons interacted with assorted thermonuclear fuels, tamper materials, and fissile materials. The 14 MeV neutrons were used to perform studies that included: elastic and inelastic scattering; interaction cross sections for the (n, 2n) reactions; interaction cross sections for Lithium and the production of undesirable particles; interaction cross sections of elements; bombardment of several substances and the resultant gamma radiation yield; neutron production and yield from fission; and neutron multiplication factors. Coon's group, Group P-4, used a graphite pile to calibrate neutron sources. A new 600 kV Cockcroft-Walton generator was under construction.

Vela Satellite
In 1967 Coon was a project scientist on the Vela HOTEL satellite project at Los Alamos Scientific Laboratory.

NRC-NAS Physics Survey
In 1972, Coon served on the Physic Survey Committee in the Impact on National Security subpanel for the NRC-NAS Physics Survey.

Swimming
In 1978, Coon at the age of 63, achieved top results in the Men's 60-64 SCY (Short Course Yards) in the 500 Freestyle and 1650 Freestyle events according to U.S. Masters Swimming records.

James H. Coon Sciences Prize
At Indiana University, the James H. Coon Sciences Prize was established by Coon and $1,500 is awarded annually to a "student who shows promise in one of the sciences".

Publications

References

1914 births
1996 deaths
Indiana University Bloomington alumni
University of Chicago alumni
20th-century American chemists
20th-century American physicists
Los Alamos National Laboratory personnel
Neutron instrumentation
Neutron sources
American male freestyle swimmers
Manhattan Project people
Fellows of the American Physical Society